Deschampsia danthonioides is a species of grass known by the common name annual hairgrass. It is native to western North America from the Yukon Territory and British Columbia, through California and the Western United States, to Baja California, and also to southern South America in Chile and Argentina.

The annual bunchgrass grows in moist to drying areas such as pond edges, meadows and grasslands, in various habitat types such as montane and chaparral.

Description
Deschampsia danthonioides has stems growing solitary or in loose clumps up to 40 to 60 centimeters tall. The inflorescence is a narrow to open array of thin branches bearing small V-shaped spikelets.

References

External links
Jepson Manual Treatment: Deschampsia danthonioides
USDA Plants Profile: Deschampsia danthonioides (annual hairgrass)
Grass Manual Treatment: Deschampsia danthonioides
CalFlora database — Deschampsia danthonioides (annual hairgrass)
Deschampsia danthonioides — U.C. Photo gallery

danthonioides
Bunchgrasses of North America
Bunchgrasses of South America
Native grasses of California
Grasses of the United States
Grasses of Canada
Grasses of Mexico
Grasses of Argentina
Flora of the Western United States
Flora of Baja California
Flora of British Columbia
Flora of Yukon
Flora of the West Coast of the United States
Flora of California
Flora of the Andes
Flora of the Rocky Mountains
Flora of the Sierra Nevada (United States)
Flora of Chile
Flora without expected TNC conservation status